Crystal Dawn Scripps McKellar is an American attorney and former child actress. She is the sister of actress Danica McKellar.

Early life 
Born in La Jolla, California, McKellar moved with her family to Los Angeles when she was seven. Her mother Mahaila was a homemaker and her father Christopher was a real estate developer. 

Her mother's ancestry is Portuguese (via the Azores and Madeira islands); her father's ancestry is Scottish, Irish, French, German, and Dutch.

McKeller and her sister Danica were both students at the Diane Hill Hardin Young Actors Space school. The sisters sometimes competed against each other for roles, including Danica's role of Winnie Cooper on The Wonder Years. Crystal would go on to play Becky Slater, a recurring character and onetime love interest of Kevin Arnold. She was nominated for the Best Young Actress Guest Starring In A Television Series award at the eleventh annual Youth in Film Awards in 1988 and 1989.

McKellar graduated from Yale University, where she was the editor of a magazine named Portia.  She graduated from Harvard Law School with a Juris Doctor degree in 2003 and worked as an associate attorney at the law firms Davis Polk & Wardwell and Morrison & Foerster.

Acting credits
Fatal Judgement (1988 television film)
The Wonder Years (television series) as Becky Slater
Guns of Paradise (television series) as Kathleen
Judgment (1990 television film) as Sabine Guitry
Hip, Edgy, Sexy, Cool (2002 film) as Actress in Class

References

External links
 

20th-century American actresses
21st-century American actresses
Actresses from San Diego
American child actresses
American film actresses
American people of Dutch descent
American people of French descent
American people of German descent
American people of Portuguese descent
American people of Scottish descent
American people of Spanish descent
American radio actresses
American television actresses
American women lawyers
Davis Polk & Wardwell lawyers
Harvard Law School alumni
Harvard-Westlake School alumni
Living people
New York (state) lawyers
Lawyers from San Diego
Yale University alumni
People associated with Morrison & Foerster
Year of birth missing (living people)